= Old Confederacy =

Old Confederacy may refer to:

- Confederate States of America
- Old Swiss Confederacy
